The 2001 FIA GT Zolder 500 km was the fifth round the 2001 FIA GT Championship season.  It took place at the Circuit Zolder, Belgium, on May 20, 2001.

Official results
Class winners in bold.  Cars failing to complete 70% of winner's distance marked as Not Classified (NC).

† – #1 Lister Storm Racing was disqualified for failing post-race technical inspection.  The car was found to be using an illegal airbox.

Statistics
 Pole position – #5 Team Rafanelli – 1:30.994
 Fastest lap – #3 Team Carsport Holland – 1:31.348
 Average speed – 146.930 km/h

References

 
 
 

Z
FIA GT
Auto races in Belgium